Miss World Australia is a national beauty pageant that selects Australia's representative to the Miss World pageant since 2002. The current Miss World Australia is Sarah Marschke from Sydney, New South Wales. Two Australian representatives have won the Miss World title, in 1968 and 1972.

History
Miss World Australia holds an annual pageant to identify young Australian women who exemplify beauty, talent, intelligence and compassion. It aims to create and empower role models who will serve as ambassadors to charity, enrich the perception of beauty, and enhance a new strength, energy and spirit for the advancement of women, while positively impacting their communities.

In 2006 the national contest was cancelled and Sabrina Houssami was controversially crowned the winner and placed second runner up at Miss World. In 2012, Jessica Kahawaty also placed second runner up. Australia has been crowned Queen of Oceania each year since 2013. Penelope Plummer became Australia's first Miss World in 1968. Belinda Green became Miss World in 1972. Before the Miss World Australia contest was instituted in 2002, Australian representatives to the international Miss World pageants were chosen from candidates at the Miss Australia pageant.

Owners 
In February 2016, was announced that the pageant has a new owner: Deborah Miller. She was the former Miss Universe Australia owner.

Titleholders
Color keys

Australian representatives at Miss World pageant before 2002
Color keys

See also 

 Miss Australia
 Miss Universe Australia
 Miss International Australia
 Miss Earth Australia

References

External links
Official website

Australia
Beauty pageants in Australia
Australian awards